Kim Fortun, an American anthropologist, is a professor at University of California Irvine's department of anthropology. Her interests extend also to   science and technology studies with a focus on environmental risk and disaster. From 2017 to 2019, she has served as the president of the Society for Social Studies of Science (4S).

In 2003, Fortun's first book, Advocacy After Bhopal: Environmentalism, Disaster, New World Orders, was awarded the Sharon Stephens Prize by the American Ethnological Society. From 2005 to 2010, she edited the Journal of Cultural Anthropology. Fortun currently helps lead multiple collaborative projects, including The Asthma Files and the Platform for Experimental and Collaborative Ethnography (PECE).

Selected works
  (Awarded the Sharon Stephens Prize, 2003).

References

External links

Living people
American anthropologists
American women anthropologists
Cultural anthropologists
Science and technology studies scholars
Year of birth missing (living people)
21st-century American women